The Kosovo Swimming Federation (/ is the national governing body of swimming in Kosovo. Founded in 1997, the FNK became a full member of the International Swimming Federation (FINA) on 17 February 2015. The FNK collaborates with the Albanian Swimming Federation where in 2012 a joint swimming tournament was hosted by the two federations.

The Kosovo Swimming Federation participated in its first FINA international competition in the 2015 World Aquatics Championships in Kazan, Russia.

FNK is expected to participate in the games in 2016 in Rio de Janeiro, Brazil. The first swimmer to represent Kosovo in the Olympics is expected to be Lum Zhaveli.

See also
 Olympic Committee of Kosovo
 Kosovo at the Olympics

References

External links
Albanian and Kosovan records in swimming

Kosovo
Swimming organizations
Swimming
1997 establishments in Italy